On 3 September 2016, at least 38 people were killed and 28 were injured after a fuel tanker carrying two people collided with a passenger bus carrying over 60 people on the dangerous Kabul-Kandahar highway in the province of Zabul, Afghanistan. The accident comes after an even larger incident that occurred on the same highway in May.

Details 
A bus carrying over 60 people, including many women and children, was hit by a fuel tanker carrying a driver and a passenger causing a large explosion during the early morning. The truck burst into flames, killing both of its occupants instantly. People in the bus were also burnt to death, resulting in only six people that could be identified by authorities. 

Drivers are also known to speed on the highway so as not to get caught in insurgent activity, especially from the Taliban. The aim is to avoid the checkpoints that the Taliban have set up, since they sometimes kidnap and kill civilians, such as what happened during the Kunduz-Takhar highway hostage crisis where hundreds were kidnapped and many killed after they were captured at a Taliban checkpoint. Many passenger buses are also old and unsafe, and Afghanistan has some of the most dangerous roads in the world.

See also 
List of traffic collisions (2010–present)
May 2016 Afghanistan road crash

References 

2016 in Afghanistan
2016 road incidents
Road incidents in Afghanistan
September 2016 events in Afghanistan
Zabul Province